Regal Glory (foaled February 14, 2016) is a Champion American multiple Grade I turf winning Thoroughbred racehorse. Her Grade I victories include the Matriarch Stakes twice at Del Mar and in 2022 the Jenny Wiley Stakes at Keeneland and Just A Game Stakes at Belmont Park. In 2022 she was awarded the Eclipse award as American Champion Female Turf Horse.

Background

Regal Glory is a chestnut mare who was bred in Kentucky by Paul Pompa Jr., a daughter of 2011 Kentucky Derby winner Animal Kingdom out of the More Than Ready mare Mary's Follies. Regal Glory is a half sister to grade 3 winner Night Prowler and Cafe Pharoah, a Grade 3 winner in Japan. The mare raced for Paul Pompa Jr. until his death in October 2020. Paul Pompa's horses were dispersed at the Keeneland 2021 January Horses of All Ages Sale and Regal Glory was sold for US$925,000 to Peter M. Brant. Sire Animal Kingdom was relocated to stand in Japan for the 2020 breeding season but he stood at Darley in Kentucky from 2014 to 2019 during this period Regal Glory was conceived.

Statistics

Legend:

 
 

Notes:

An (*) asterisk after the odds means Regal Glory was the post-time favorite.

Pedigree

References

2016 racehorse births
Racehorses bred in Kentucky
Racehorses trained in the United States
Thoroughbred family 1-k
American Grade 1 Stakes winners